The Gulf of Euboea, Euboean Gulf, Euboic Sea or Euboic Gulf is an arm of the Aegean Sea between the island of Euboea (northeast coastline) and the Greek mainland (southwest coastline). Trending diagonally northwest–southeast, the gulf is divided by the narrow Strait of Euripus, at the town of Chalcis.

See also
 Argolic Gulf, Saronic Gulf - nearby gulfs of Greece

References
 Encyclopædia Britannica, article "Gulf of Euboea" (description), 2006, webpage: EB-GulfEuboea.

Gulfs of Greece
Gulfs of the Aegean Sea
Landforms of Central Greece
Landforms of Euboea (regional unit)
Landforms of East Attica
Landforms of Boeotia
Landforms of Phthiotis
Landforms of Attica